Mohammad Daneshvar Khorram (born 18 December 1993 in Mashhad) is an Iranian cyclist who won the gold medal at the 2014 Asian Games in men's Keirin.

References 
 Profile

1993 births
Living people
Iranian male cyclists
Iranian track cyclists
Asian Games gold medalists for Iran
Asian Games medalists in cycling
Cyclists at the 2014 Asian Games
Cyclists at the 2018 Asian Games
Medalists at the 2014 Asian Games
21st-century Iranian people